Turks and Caicos Islands Community College (TCICC) is a community college in the Turks and Caicos, a British territory in the Caribbean. It has two campuses with one each in Grand Turk and Providenciales.

It opened on 18 September 1994 due to a statute that took in effect on the 2nd of that month. Initially H. J. Robinson High School in Grand Turk and Clement Howell High School in Provindenciales housed the college on a temporary basis. The current Providenciales campus opened in September 2007.

References

External links
 Turks and Caicos Islands Community College

Community colleges
Universities and colleges in British Overseas Territories
Educational organisations based in the Turks and Caicos Islands